Elections to Broxtowe Borough Council were held on 2 May 2019.

Summary

Election result

|-

Ward results

Attenborough & Chilwell East

Awsworth, Cossall & Trowell

Beeston Central

Beeston North

Beeston Rylands

Beeston West

Bramcote

Brinsley

Chilwell West

Eastwood Hall

Eastwood Hilltop

Eastwood St. Mary's

Greasley

Kimberley

Nuthall East & Strelley

Stapleford North

Stapleford South East (delayed)
The election in Stapleford South East was delayed until 13 June due to the death of a candidate.

Stapleford South West

Toton & Chilwell Meadows

Watnall & Nuthall West

References

2019 English local elections
May 2019 events in the United Kingdom
2019
2010s in Nottinghamshire